The Terrorist is a young adult novel by Caroline B. Cooney, published in 1997.  It deals with Laura Williams, a sixteen-year-old American who attends an international school in London.  When her younger brother, Billy, is killed by a terrorist bomb handed to him by a stranger on the subway, Laura becomes obsessed with revenge.  She suspects everyone, including her classmates, and wonders about their associations with such causes as the PLO or the IRA. Laura knows nothing of world politics at first, but she quickly learns that the world is a dangerous place and many nations have many enemies. The situation is complicated when an Iranian classmate named Jehran asks Laura to give her Billy's passport to help her escape an arranged marriage. This book has been frequently challenged due to its portrayal of Muslims.

References

American young adult novels
1997 American novels
Novels set in London